The Pi Chapter House of Psi Upsilon Fraternity is a building on the Syracuse University campus built in 1898 that was designed by Wellington W. Taber. It was listed on the National Register of Historic Places in 1985. It is significant for its Neoclassical design, and its historic role as "the oldest intact surviving fraternity residence at Syracuse University and for its association with the emergence of fraternal organizations as major components of Syracuse college life at the turn of the 20th century."

The building underwent $350,000 facade renovation, which was carried out in phases between 2009 and 2013. The crowning touches were completed in September 2014. The renovations were intended to restore the house to its historical architectural integrity. The exterior was painted white, replacing the darker yellow tint enduring since the mid-1970s. 

It is located at 101 College Place.

See also
List of Registered Historic Places in Onondaga County, New York
Psi Upsilon

References

Clubhouses on the National Register of Historic Places in New York (state)
Pi Chapter House of Psi Upsilon Fraternity
Fraternity and sorority houses
University and college buildings on the National Register of Historic Places in New York (state)
Psi Upsilon
National Register of Historic Places in Syracuse, New York